Jo Wilson is a Scottish television presenter who currently works for Sky Sports News.

Career
Wilson started as a Graduate Trainee at Sky Sports News in 2011, before becoming a sub editor then getting promoted to co-producer. This led her to making her screen debut as a presenter on Sky Sports News in 2015.

Education
Wilson graduated from Glasgow Caledonian University with a Masters in journalism in 2011. During her studies Wilson worked at Pizza Hut in Stirling.

Personal life
As a sprinter and a jumper, Wilson represented Perth and her county. Receiving an athletics scholarship when she was 17, she spent a year at a Stony Brook High School in New York doing athletics and basketball. She supports St Johnstone F.C. Wilson saw her first match at McDiamid Park aged 7 in November 1992 against Motherwell, the game was abandoned at half time because of snow. On 23 September 2020, Wilson gave birth to a daughter. Wilson returned to Sky Sports News on 20 April 2021, after being on maternity leave for 13 months due to COVID-19 restrictions.

On 5 September 2022, Wilson announced that she had been diagnosed with stage III cervical cancer following a recent smear test.

She returned to Sky Sports News on 30 November 2022, co-hosting on the 7pm timeslot.

References

1985 births
Scottish television presenters
Scottish women television presenters
Scottish women journalists
Sky Sports presenters and reporters
People educated at Perth High School
Living people